Round Lake is a commuter railroad station on Metra's Milwaukee District North Line in Round Lake, Illinois. In Metra's zone-based fare system, Round Lake is in zone I. As of 2018, Round Lake is the 121st busiest of Metra's 236 non-downtown stations, with an average of 395 weekday boardings.

As of December 12, 2022, Round Lake is served by 29 trains (13 inbound, 16 outbound) on weekdays, by 18 trains (nine in each direction) on Saturdays, and by all 18 trains (nine in each direction) on Sundays and holidays.

Bus connections
Pace
 570 Fox Lake-CLC

References

External links

Dynamic Depot Maps image
Station from Cedar Lake Road from Google Maps Street View

Metra stations in Illinois
Former Chicago, Milwaukee, St. Paul and Pacific Railroad stations
Railway stations in Lake County, Illinois